"Sister Fate" is a song by Sheila E. from the album Romance 1600. It was released as the first single from the album in 1985. The album version of the song features an organ and percussion intro and has a running time of 3:50; the single version omits the intro and has a running time of 3:39.

Music video
The video introduced a new image for Sheila E., dressed in a brocaded "cloud jacket" that harkened back to Prince's "cloud suit" from his contemporaneously (1985) released video "Raspberry Beret".  At the timestamp of 3:06 within the video, an image of Prince from "Raspberry Beret" is superimposed for one second over a newspaper graphic with the headline "WHO IS SHEILA E.'S MYSTERY LOVE?"

Chart performance
The song stalled on the charts and went no higher than #36 on the R&B charts, and did not chart on the Hot 100. It peaked at #8 on the Bubbling Under Hot 100 chart. Because of the under performance of "Sister Fate", the second single, "A Love Bizarre" (which featured Prince) was rush released.

Chart positions

Formats and track listings
U.S. 7"
 "Sister Fate" (edit) – 3:39
 "Sister Fate" (instrumental) – 3:39

U.S. 12"
 "Sister Fate" (extended) – 5:45
 "Save the People" – 8:28

References

Songs written by Prince (musician)
Sheila E. songs
Paisley Park Records singles
Song recordings produced by Prince (musician)